Lewis Baker (November 11, 1832 – April 30, 1899) was the Democratic President of the West Virginia Senate from Ohio County and served from 1871 to 1872.

Lewis Baker was born in Belmont County, Ohio, in 1832. In the 1850 US Federal Census, he is listed as an apprentice printer in Perry Township, Tuscarawas County, Ohio. He was admitted to practice law in Ohio. He declined the Democratic Party nomination to congress in his twenty fifth year.

Just before the 1860 census, he married Ruth Amanda Fordyce, daughter of John Fordyce and Ruth Greg. Ruth was born August 12, 1842 in Ohio. In 1860, Lewis and Ruth were living in Cambridge in Guernsey County, Ohio. Lewis' occupation was listed as editor and publisher.

By 1870, Lewis and Ruth were living in Ohio County, West Virginia with their children John, Mary, Harry, Anna, and Jennie. Harry was born in West Virginia in 1865, dating the family's move. Lewis' occupation was listed as journalist.

On June 20, 1863, West Virginia became the 35th state in the Union. The Wheeling Custom House served as the first state house. Lewis Baker served as a state senator from 1871 to 1872. He was elected president of the Senate on January 17, 1871.

On February 1, 1885 Lewis purchased the St. Paul Globe and moved his family to Minnesota.

In 1893 Baker was appointed as the United States Minister to Nicaragua, Costa Rica and El Salvador. He sailed from New York aboard the ship Costa Rico on April 29, 1893 with his daughters Anne and Virginia. They arrived in Managua on May 12, 1893 in the midst of a revolution.

Baker died in 1899 of anemia and was buried with his wife in Greenwood Cemetery in Wheeling, West Virginia.

References

 
 
 
 

|-

|-

1832 births
1899 deaths
Ambassadors of the United States to Costa Rica
Ambassadors of the United States to El Salvador
Ambassadors of the United States to Nicaragua
19th-century American diplomats
Burials at Greenwood Cemetery (Wheeling, West Virginia)
Journalists from West Virginia
People from Ohio County, West Virginia
People from Tuscarawas County, Ohio
Presidents of the West Virginia State Senate
Democratic Party West Virginia state senators
Ohio lawyers
19th-century American newspaper publishers (people)
People from Belmont County, Ohio
19th-century American journalists
American male journalists
19th-century American male writers
19th-century American politicians
Journalists from Ohio
People from Cambridge, Ohio
19th-century American lawyers